Novosad Island is a small ice-covered island, one of the Lyall Islands, lying 4 miles north-northeast of Cape Dayman, off the northern coast of Victoria Land, Antarctica. Novosad Island is located at 70° 42' 0" S, 167° 29' 0". It was mapped by the USGS from surveys and U.S. Navy air photos, 1960–63, and named by US-ACAN for Lt. Charles L. Novosad, Jr., medical officer at the Naval Air Facility, McMurdo Sound, in 1957.

References

Islands of Victoria Land
Pennell Coast